Michael Bramwell is an American visual artist based in North Carolina. He graduated from Oakwood University in Huntsville, Alabama and received a Master of Arts from Columbia University, an M.F.A. from the University of North Carolina at Chapel Hill and a PhD candidate in the Department of American Studies. He is an Andrew W. Mellon Humanities for the Public Good Fellow and an alumnus of the MoMA/P.S.1 National Studio Program  and the Skowhegan School of Painting and Sculpture in Maine.

He has exhibited  work at: Neuberger Museum of Art, New Museum of Contemporary Art, The Portland Museum of Art, MoMA/P.S.1, International Print Center, Sotheby's, Jack Tilton Gallery, Gagosian Gallery, Delaware Center for Contemporary Art and Florida Center for Contemporary Art. His work is included in Public Collections of: Jersey City Museum, New School University, New York City, Schomburg Center for Research in Black Culture.

Awards
2010 Artists' Fellowship
2001 Joan Mitchell Foundation Fellowship
2000 New York Foundation for the Arts
1999 Pollock-Krasner Foundation Fellowship
1997 Rema Hort Mann Foundation Fellowship
1996 Asian Cultural Council Fellowship

References

External links
http://aavad.com/artstibliog.cfm?id=8688
http://www.gunk.org/grants.html#bramwell
http://64.124.30.150/html/artistresults.asp?artist=327&testing=true
https://web.archive.org/web/20111006201742/http://creativetime.org/archive/index.php?5=michael+bramwell
http://www.nytimes.com/2001/08/19/.../the-downtowning-of-uptown.html?...4
https://web.archive.org/web/20100702223502/http://www.nyfa.org/nyfa_artists_detail.asp?pid=487
http://www.saatchi-gallery.co.uk/yourgallery/artistprofile//119090
http://franklinfurnace.org/artist/FOTP/tfotp99/text3.html
http://www.albany.edu/museum/wwwmuseum/criminal/artists/index.html

Living people
American artists
People from the Bronx
Oakwood University alumni
Columbia University alumni
Year of birth missing (living people)
Skowhegan School of Painting and Sculpture alumni